Shogun is a free, open-source machine learning software library  written in C++. It offers numerous algorithms and data structures for machine learning problems. It offers interfaces for Octave, Python, R, Java, Lua, Ruby and C# using SWIG.

It is licensed under the terms of the GNU General Public License version 3 or later.

Description

The focus of Shogun is on kernel machines such as support vector machines for regression and classification problems. Shogun also offers a full implementation of Hidden Markov models.
The core of Shogun is written in C++ and offers interfaces for MATLAB, Octave, Python, R, Java, Lua, Ruby and C#.
Shogun has been under active development since 1999. Today there is a vibrant user community all over the world using Shogun as a base for research and education, and contributing to the core package.

Supported algorithms
Currently Shogun supports the following algorithms:
 Support vector machines
 Dimensionality reduction algorithms, such as PCA, Kernel PCA, Locally Linear Embedding, Hessian Locally Linear Embedding, Local Tangent Space Alignment, Linear Local Tangent Space Alignment, Kernel Locally Linear Embedding, Kernel Local Tangent Space Alignment, Multidimensional Scaling, Isomap, Diffusion Maps, Laplacian Eigenmaps
 Online learning algorithms such as SGD-QN, Vowpal Wabbit
 Clustering algorithms: k-means and GMM
 Kernel Ridge Regression, Support Vector Regression
 Hidden Markov Models
 K-Nearest Neighbors
 Linear discriminant analysis
 Kernel Perceptrons.

Many different kernels are implemented, ranging from kernels for numerical data (such as gaussian or linear kernels) to kernels on special data (such as strings over certain alphabets). The currently implemented kernels for numeric data include:
 linear
 gaussian
 polynomial
 sigmoid kernels

The supported kernels for special data include:
 Spectrum
 Weighted Degree
 Weighted Degree with Shifts

The latter group of kernels allows processing of arbitrary sequences over fixed alphabets such as DNA sequences as well as whole e-mail texts.

Special features
As Shogun was developed with bioinformatics applications in mind it is capable of processing huge datasets consisting of up to 10 million samples.	
Shogun supports the use of pre-calculated kernels. It is also possible to use a combined kernel i.e. a kernel consisting of a linear combination of arbitrary kernels over different domains. The coefficients or weights of the linear combination can be learned as well. For this purpose Shogun offers a multiple kernel learning functionality.

References
 S. Sonnenburg, G. Rätsch, S. Henschel, C. Widmer, J. Behr, A. Zien, F. De Bona, A. Binder, C. Gehl and V. Franc: The SHOGUN Machine Learning Toolbox, Journal of Machine Learning Research, 11:1799−1802, June 11, 2010.
 M. Gashler. Waffles: A Machine Learning Toolkit. Journal of Machine Learning Research, 12 (July):2383–2387, 2011.
 P. Vincent, Y. Bengio, N. Chapados, and O. Delalleau. Plearn high-performance machine learning library. URL http://plearn.berlios.de/.

External links
 Shogun toolbox homepage
 
 

C++ libraries
Free software programmed in C++
Data mining and machine learning software
Free statistical software
Free computer libraries
Free mathematics software
Free science software